Ipunga  is a ward in the  Mbozi District of Songwe Region, Tanzania.  Its postal code is 53316. In 2016 the Tanzania National Bureau of Statistics report there were 10,657 people in the ward, from 9,367 in 2012.

References

Wards of Songwe Region